= Gaddikurvinkoppa =

- Village
- Interactive map of Gaddikurvinkoppa
- Coordinates: 15.756°N 74.705°E
- Country: India
- State: Karnataka
- District: Belgaum

Languages
  - Official: Kannada
- Time zone: UTC+5:30 (IST)

Gaddikurvinkoppa is a village in Belagavi district in the southern state of Karnataka, India.
